Menk is a surname. Notable people with the surname include:

 Eric Menk (born 1974), a Filipino-American basketball player
 Gerhard Menk (1946–2019) a German historian and archivist
 Ismail ibn Musa Menk (born 1975), a Zimbabwean Islamic scholar
 Louis W. Menk (1918–1999), an American railway worker and executive